WASP-2b is an extrasolar planet orbiting the star WASP-2 located about 500 light years away in the constellation of Delphinus. It was discovered via the transit method, and then follow up measurements using the radial velocity method confirmed that WASP-2b was a planet. The planet's mass and radius indicate that it is a gas giant with a similar bulk composition to Jupiter. Unlike Jupiter, but similar to many other planets detected around other stars, WASP-2b is located very close to its star, and belongs to the class of planets known as hot Jupiters. A 2008 study concluded that the WASP-2b system (among others) is a binary star system allowing even more accurate determination of stellar and planetary parameters.

See also
 HD 209458 b
 WASP-1b
 SuperWASP

References

External links

 NewScientistSpace: Third 'puffed-up planet' discovered
 BBC News article
 WASP Planets

Exoplanets discovered by WASP
Exoplanets discovered in 2006
Giant planets
Hot Jupiters
Transiting exoplanets
Delphinus (constellation)